Former Nebel Knitting Mill is a historic textile mill building located at Charlotte, Mecklenburg County, North Carolina. It was designed by noted mill architect Richard C. Biberstein and built in 1927 and expanded in 1929.  It is a two-story, reinforced concrete building with a brick veneer and decorative concrete detailing with Art Moderne detailing.  The building has a rectangular plan measuring 204 feet across the facade and 182 feet deep.  The 1927 portion has a stepped-parapet roofline with concrete coping, while the mill's 1929 part has concrete coping and a simple, crenelated roofline.

It was added to the National Register of Historic Places in 1991.

References

Textile mills in North Carolina
Industrial buildings and structures on the National Register of Historic Places in North Carolina
Industrial buildings completed in 1929
Buildings and structures in Charlotte, North Carolina
National Register of Historic Places in Mecklenburg County, North Carolina